The ninth season of the stop-motion television series Robot Chicken began airing in the United States on Cartoon Network's late night programming block, Adult Swim, on December 10, 2017, containing 20 episodes.

Episodes

References

2017 American television seasons
2018 American television seasons
Robot Chicken seasons